The 1876 Berkshire by-election was fought on 23 February 1876.  The byelection was fought due to the resignation of the incumbent Conservative MP, Richard Fellowes Benyon.  It was won by the Conservative candidate Philip Wroughton in an all Conservative fight.

References

1876 elections in the United Kingdom
1876 in England
19th century in Berkshire
By-elections to the Parliament of the United Kingdom in Berkshire constituencies